is  the former Head coach of the Saitama Broncos in the Japanese Bj League.

Head coaching record

|- 
| style="text-align:left;"|Saitama Broncos
| style="text-align:left;"|2006-07
| 40||15||25|||| style="text-align:center;"|6th in Bj|||-||-||-||
| style="text-align:center;"|-
|-

References

1967 births
Living people
Tokai University alumni

Japanese basketball coaches

Saitama Broncos coaches
Saitama Broncos players